Sebastian Kronenwetter (January 20, 1833 – April 27, 1902) was a Wisconsin pioneer, businessman, and state legislator.

Born in Württemberg, Kronenwetter and his family emigrated to the United States settling in Pennsylvania. In 1857, Kronenwetter came to Marathon County, Wisconsin, where he was in the logging and lumbering business in the Mosinee, Wisconsin area. The village of Kronenwetter, Wisconsin was named after him. In 1885–1887, Kronenwetter served in the Wisconsin State Assembly, as a Democrat, for one term.

His grandson, Ralph E. Kronenwetter, would become Mayor of Mosinee.

Notes

1833 births
1902 deaths
German emigrants to the United States
People from Mosinee, Wisconsin
Businesspeople from Wisconsin
Democratic Party members of the Wisconsin State Assembly
19th-century American politicians
19th-century American businesspeople